UABC may refer to:

 Universidad Autónoma de Baja California
 United Aircraft Building Corporation